Cwmgors is a village in the county of Glamorgan, and administered as part of the unitary authority borough of Neath Port Talbot, Wales. It is part of the community of Gwaun-cae-Gurwen and lies within the ceremonial county of West Glamorgan.

Cwmgors sits in the Neath constituency and is thus represented in Parliament by Christina Rees and in the Senedd by Jeremy Miles.

Its church, Llanfair, falls under the Diocese of St David's. Its Welsh-medium primary school feeds to three local comprehensive schools, namely Ysgol Gyfun Ystalyfera for fully Welsh-medium education, Ysgol Uwchradd Dyffryn Aman for Welsh- and English-medium education, and Cwmtawe Community Comprehensive School for English-medium education.

Tommy Davies 
Tommy Davies was a middleweight boxer who in 1945 fought and lost to Marcel Cerdan at The Palais des Sports, Paris, France. By 1948 Cerdan was world middleweight champion after defeating Tony Zale in 1948 at Roosevelt Stadium, Jersey City, New Jersey, United States. Tommy Davies worked as a coal miner at Cwmgors Colliery and Abernant Colliery, up until circa 1979.

See also 
Cwmgors RFC
The Electric Revelators

References

External links 
www.geograph.co.uk : photos of Cwmgors and surrounding area

Villages in Neath Port Talbot